Stanley Vincent Brain (1903–1969) was an Australian rugby league footballer who played in the 1920s and 1930s.

Career
Born at Newcastle, New South Wales in 1903, Brain played with St George during the club's foundation years. He played five season for the Saints between 1927 and 1933, and in 1929 he was captain. 

Brain represented New South Wales on six occasions in 1925, 1927 and 1928. He returned to Newcastle after 1932. He also played in the 1927  NSWRFL Final on the wing, of which Saints were runners up that day.

Brain died at Hamilton, New South Wales in 1969, aged 66.

References

St. George Dragons players
Australian rugby league players
New South Wales rugby league team players
1903 births
1969 deaths
Rugby league wingers